Ismail Ragab (born 21 June 1921, date of death unknown) was an Egyptian weightlifter. He competed in the men's middleweight event at the 1952 Summer Olympics.

References

1921 births
Year of death missing
Egyptian male weightlifters
Olympic weightlifters of Egypt
Weightlifters at the 1952 Summer Olympics
Place of birth missing
20th-century Egyptian people